An engram, as used in Dianetics and Scientology, is a detailed mental image or memory of a traumatic event from the past that occurred when an individual was partially or fully unconscious. It is considered to be pseudoscientific and is different from the meaning of "engram" in cognitive psychology. According to Dianetics and Scientology, from conception onwards, whenever something painful happens while the "analytic mind" is unconscious, engrams are supposedly being recorded and stored in an area of the mind Scientology calls the "reactive mind".

The term engram was coined in 1904 by the German scholar Richard Semon, who defined it as a "stimulus impression" which could be reactivated by the recurrence of "the energetic conditions which ruled at the generation of the engram." L. Ron Hubbard re-used Semon's concept when he published Dianetics: The Modern Science of Mental Health in 1950. He conceived of the engram as a form of "memory trace", an idea which had long existed in medicine. According to physician Joseph Winter, who collaborated in the development of the Dianetics philosophy, Hubbard had taken the term "engram" from a 1936 edition of Dorland's Medical Dictionary, where it was defined as "a lasting mark or trace...In psychology it is the lasting trace left in the psyche by anything that has been experienced psychically; a latent memory picture." Hubbard had originally used the terms "Norn", "comanome" and "impediment" before alighting on "engram" following a suggestion from Winter. Hubbard equates the reactive mind to the engram or reactive memory bank. An engram is described as a "cellular level recording" that includes both physical and emotional pain. Engrams are stored in chains or series of incidents that are similar. Hubbard describes the engram as "a definite and permanent trace left by a stimulus on the protoplasm of a tissue. It is considered a unit group of stimuli impinged solely on the cellular being."

In Dianetics and Scientology doctrine, engrams are believed to originate from painful incidents, which close down the "analytic function", leaving a person to operate only on the "reactive" level, where everything, including pain, position and location are experienced as "aspects of the unpleasant whole." This engram is restimulated if the person is reminded of the painful experience days later, causing feelings of guilt or embarrassment – another engram. This cycle is called a "lock" in Scientology terminology.

Hubbard's concept of the engram evolved over time. In Dianetics, he wrote that "The word engram, in Dianetics is used in its severely accurate sense as a 'definite and permanent trace left by a stimulus on the protoplasm of a tissue'", which followed fairly closely the original definition in Dorland's. He later repudiated the idea that an engram was a physical cellular trace, redefining his concept as being "a mental image picture of a moment of pain and unconsciousness". According to Hubbard whenever an engram is stimulated it increases in power. Jeff Jacobsen compared auditing for engrams in Scientology to the Freudian psychoanalytic concept of abreaction, equating engrams to the painful subconscious memories that abreaction therapy brings up to the conscious mind. He quoted Nathaniel Thornton, who compared abreaction to confession. Dorthe Refslund Christensen describes engrams in layman's terms as trauma, a means to explain the long and short term effects of painful experiences. According to Christensen, Hubbard wrote about the dramatization of an engram, where the one who suffered and recorded the pain as an engram relates all sensory perceptions during the time of the painful incident to the incident. These sensory perceptions become "restimulators" that remind the individual of the pain and triggers him or her to re-experience it.

Scholar Richard Holloway writes that according to Scientology, engrams are "damaging experiences that happen by accident," bruises through time implanted on thetans through the course of millions of lives. Sometimes the damage is intentionally inflicted by thetans who desired power over other thetans. Deliberate injuries are called implants in Scientology. Hubbard wrote, "Implants result in all varieties of illness, apathy, degradiation, neurosis and insanity and are the principle causes of these in man." The Christian idea of heaven is a deceptive implant, Hubbard taught, for there is an infinite series of lives after the first, contrary to the Christian notion of the afterlife.

Dianetics became Scientology in 1952 and the concept of clearing engrams remains a central part of the practices of the Church of Scientology.

See also
 Silent birth
 Samskara

References

External links
 ScientologyToday.org: What is an engram?
 "Dianetics" on The Skeptic's Dictionary

Scientology beliefs and practices